Star Trek: 25th Anniversary is a 1992 Game Boy video game developed by Visual Concepts and published by Ultra, based upon the Star Trek universe. The game chronicles a mission of James T. Kirk and his crew of the USS Enterprise. Despite having the same name, the Game Boy version is not a port of the NES game or computer versions, and is in fact a completely different game. It was succeeded by Star Trek: The Next Generation for Game Boy, developed and published by Absolute Entertainment the following year.

Plot

The Game Boy version of Star Trek: 25th Anniversary starts with Captain Kirk receiving a message from Admiral McQuilkin at Starfleet Base 4:

"Greetings Captain Kirk. The challenge facing you today carries grave consequences for the future of the galaxy. A giant machine known as the Doomsday Machine now roams space, obliterating whole worlds in its path, its origin unknown. Having detected its approach five months ago, our Federation engineers began production of the Proto-Matter Fusion Disruptor, a powerful new device we believe to be capable of stopping the giant machine. Just as the planet killer entered the bounds of Federation space, a fully functional Disruptor was being installed on the U.S.S. Excalibur, to be taken to Sector Alpha-9, to confront the menace. Tragically, the Klingons, having learned of the Disruptor's existence, but not its purpose, and fearing its use against their empire, have intercepted and disabled the Excalibur. They have stolen the Disruptor, and unwittingly doomed countless worlds to extinction. Preliminary investigation has revealed that the Klingons, for purposes of security, have disassembled the Disruptor and hidden it in 12 pieces, on three separate worlds. Your mission is to recover the Disruptor and stop the planet killer. Our intelligence reports suggest planet Neural in Zeta Bootis is the best place to start your search. Good luck, Kirk. The fate of the galaxy is in your hands."

Gameplay

Space Travel
These levels of the game take the form of a shoot 'em up.  From the map, the player can move the Enterprise to different levels, including:

 Asteroid fields, where the player must avoid asteroids, as well as the gravitational pull of the planets
 Klingon Warships, which are asteroid fields that also include Klingons firing on the player 
 Romulan Warships, which can use their cloaking devices to avoid the player's fire
 Tholian Warships, in which the player must also evade the Tholian Webs
 Space Amoebas, in which the player moves at a slower speed.  

The player uses the ship icon at the bottom of the screen to track progress through the levels. The player has two weapons available while in ship mode: phasers and photon torpedoes. In the power menu the player may choose to divert power to or from speed, shields, or phasers. The Enterprise must defeat many enemy ships and hit warps and collect energy to advance, while avoiding asteroids and enemy fire, as well as the gravitational pull of planets.

Away Missions
At the end of each map is a planet that contains the parts of the Disruptor.  Kirk, Spock, and Bones beam down to find the parts.  Here, the game takes the form of an adventure game, with the player taking control of Kirk.  As Kirk, the player uses a tricorder to find the Disruptor parts and identify various obstacles.  Occasionally, Spock or Bones will call Kirk on his communicator to offer help.  The only weapon Kirk has is a phaser, which he can use to stun enemies or destroy obstacles.  Once all four weapons parts have been located, the team beams back up to the ship.

After completing three maps and three away missions, the player takes on the Doomsday Machine.

Doomsday Machine
Before the final boss, a Red Alert flashes on the screen, warning that the Doomsday Machine is dead ahead. In the last level the player must advance the Enterprise past other destroyed Federation starships and asteroids while dodging starship-sized fire balls coming from the Doomsday Machine. The player then must destroy the machine in progressively smaller segments while continuing to avoid fire balls. When the game is beaten, the player receives a final message from Admiral McQuilkin at Starfleet Base 4: "Congratulations, Kirk. You've destroyed the planet-killer, and saved the galaxy. The Federation owes you its thanks."

Reception
Allgame gave this video a rating of 2.5 stars out of 5. In the June 1992 issue of N-Force, the game was evaluated with a rating of 46% (the equivalent of an "F" letter grade).

References

1992 video games
Action video games
Game Boy games
Game Boy-only games
Science fiction video games
25th Anniversary
Video games developed in the United States
Single-player video games